Lou Pérez (June 21, 1928 – May 27, 2005) was an American flautist, pianist, violinist, bandleader, composer and arranger. He was one of the most influential and popular charanga musicians in the 1960s and 1970s, and his music was used in the film Dirty Dancing.

Early life
He was born in New York City, to parents from Puerto Rico and Cuba. At the age of four, he moved with his father to Manzanillo, Cuba, and then to Havana, returning to New York when he was nine years old. He studied music, first playing the bass before moving to the saxophone, flute, and percussion.

Career 
As a young musician, he was involved in the bands of Gilberto Valdés, Noro Morales, Belisario López and others, before forming his own band at the height of the charanga craze in New York in the early-1960s. Before mentioning his soloist career, let's point out from a 2004 interview where he discussed he used to play the violin. Plus on the very same interview, one can appreciate a photo showcasing Lou playing the piano as well on the far left with a light color coat and black tuxedo pants. He had several successful album releases, including Para La Fiesta Voy (1961), Bon Bon de Chocolate! (1962), Tamboleo (1964), Of Latin Extraction (1966), Barrio (1972), Fantasia Africana (1975), and Nuestra Herencia (1976). In all, he recorded 15 albums, and also recorded music for films and commercials. His song "De Todo un Poco", from his 1977 album of the same name, was used on the soundtrack to the hit movie Dirty Dancing in 1987, and his earlier albums became collectors' items.

Death
He died at the age of 76, from injuries he sustained when he was hit by a car while crossing a street in Manhattan.

References

1928 births
2005 deaths
American flautists
Musicians from New York (state)
American bandleaders
20th-century American musicians
American people of Cuban descent
American people of Puerto Rican descent
American expatriates in Cuba
20th-century flautists